According to a chronology over Averroes’ writings by Joseph Kenny OP, Averroes first writings date from his age of 31 (year 1157).

The following is a bibliography of Averroes' works.

Medicine
Kulliyat (Colliget).
A compilation of the works of Galen.
A commentary on the Canon of Medicine (Qanun fi 't-tibb) of Avicenna.

Logic

Short Commentary
 [1] Short Commentary on Aristotle's Organon / Epitome in Libros Logicæ Aristotelis / Tajrīd al-ʾaqāwīl al-ḍarūrīya min ṣināʿat al-manṭiq (Aka: Al-ḍarūrī; Al-ḍarūrī fī l-manṭiq; Kitāb fī l-manṭiq; Muḫtaṣar fī l-manṭiq) تجريد الأقاويل الضرورية من صناعة المنطق، او الضروري، الضروري في المنطق، كتاب في المنطق، مختصر في المنطقca. 552/1157

Middle Commentaries
 [2] Middle Commentary on the Isagoge / Talḫīṣ madḫal fī Furfūrīyūs (Aka: Talḥīṣ kitāb ʾĪsāġūjī) 
Talḫīṣ kitāb ʾArisṭū fī l-manṭiq  تلخيص مدخل فرفوريوس أو تلخيص كتاب إيساغوجي أو تلخيص كتاب أرسطو في المنطق 
 [3] Middle Commentary on the Categories / Talḫīṣ kitāb al-maqūlāt تلخيص كتاب المقولات
 [4] Middle Commentary on Peri hermeneias / Talḫīṣ kitāb al-ʿibāra تلخيص كتاب العبارة
 [5] Middle Commentary on the Prior Analytics / Media Expositio in Libros Priorum Resolutoriorum / Talḫīṣ kitāb al-qiyās تلخيص كتاب القياس
 [6] Middle Commentary on the Posterior Analytics / Media Expositio in Libros Posteriorum Resolutoriorum / Talḫīṣ kitāb al-burhān (Aka: Talḫīṣ kitāb al-burhān li-ʾArisṭūṭālīs; Talḫīṣ kitāb al-burhān lahū) تلخيص كتاب البرهان، تلخيص كتاب البرهان لأرسطاطاليس
 [7] Middle Commentary on the Topics / Talḫīṣ kitāb al-jadal تلخيص كتاب الجدل 
 [8] Middle Commentary on the Sophistici Elenchi / Talḫīṣ kitāb al-safsaṭa تلخيص كتاب السفسطة 
 [9] Middle Commentary on the Rhetoric / Talḫīṣ al-ḫiṭāba تلخيص كتاب الخطابة  [570/1175 or 571/1176]
 [10] Middle Commentary on the Poetics / Talḫīṣ kitāb al-šiʿr تلخيص كتاب الشعر

Long Commentaries
 [11] Long Commentary on the Prior Analytics (?) / Šarḥ kitāb al-qiyās li-ʾArisṭūṭālīs (Aka: Kitāb šarḥ kitāb al-qiyās li-ʾArisṭū) شرح كتاب القياس لارسطاطاليس، كتاب شرح كتاب القياص لارسطو
 [12] Long Commentary on the Posterior Analytics / Šarḥ kitāb al-burhān شرح كتاب البرهان

Questions
 [13] Questions on Logic / Quæsita in libros logicæ Aristotelis / (Part of: Masāʿil fī l-ḥikma, aka: Muqaddimāt fī l-ḥikma) مسائل في الحكمة، مقدمة في الحكمة

Questions on the Isagoge
 [13.1] On Alfarabi on the Isagoge about genus and differentia /  Kalām ʿalā qawl ʾAbī Naṣr fī l-madḫal wa-l-jins wa-l-faṣl yuštarikān كلام على قول ابي نصر في المدخل و الجنس و الفصل يشتركان

Questions on the Categories
 [13.2] On substantial and accidental universals / Al-qawl fī kullīyāt al-jawhar wa-kullīyāt al-ʾaʿraḍ (Aka: Bāb ʿalā maqūla ʾawwal kitāb ʾAbī Naṣr (?), Maqāla ʿalā ʾawwal maqūla ʾAbī Naṣr (?)) القول في كليات الجواهر و كليات الاعراض، باب على مقولة اول كتاب ابي نصر، مقالة على اول مقولة ابي نصر

Questions on Peri hermeneias
 [13.3] On the copula and on derived nouns / Maqāla fī l-kalima wa-l-ism al-muštaqq (Aka: Kalām lahū ʿalā l-kalima wa-l-ism al-muštaqq, Min kitāb al-ʿibāra li-ʾAbī Naṣr) مقالة في الكلمة و الاسم المشتق، كلام له على الكلمة و الاسم المشتق، من كتاب العبارة لابي نصر 
 [13.4] On compound and simple predicates / Min kitāb al-ʿibāra (Aka: De prædicatis compositis et divisis) من كتاب العبارة

Questions on the Prior Analytics
 [13.5] On the definition: Critique of the positions of Alexander and Alfarabi / Al-qawl fī l-ḥadd wa-naqd mā ḏahaba ʾilayhī al-ʾIskandar wa-ʾAbū Naṣr (Aka: Maqāla fī l-ḥadd (juzʾ al-qiyās) wa-naqd maḏahabay al-ʾIskandar wa-ʾAbī Naṣr; De definitione termini) القول في الحد و نقد ما ذهب اليه الاسكندر و ابو نصر، مقالة في الحد جزء القياس و نقد ما ذهب اليه الاسكندر و ابي نصر
 [13.6] Critique of Avicenna's position on the conversion of premises / Naqd maḏhab Ibn Sīnā fī inʿikās al-qaḍāyā (Aka: Maqāla fī naqd maḏhab Ibn Sīnā fī ʿaks al-qaḍāyā; De conversionibus) نقد مذهب ابن سيناء في انعكاس القضايا، مقالة في نقد مذهب ابن سيناء في عكس القضايا 
 [13.7] Critique of Themistius's position on the contingent syllogisms in the first and second figure / Naqd maḏhab Tāmisṭiyūs fī l-maqāyīs al-mumkina fī l-šaklayn al-ʾawwal wa-l-ṯānī (Aka: De conditione syllogismorum contingentium circa duo eorum attributa, videlicet de numerositate illationis, et de figura in qua non concludunt)  نقد مذهب تامسطيوس في المقاييس الممكنة في الشكلين الاول و الثاني
 [13.8] Chapter on absolute premises / Maqāla fī l-muqaddima al-muṭlaqa (Aka: Quid sit propositio absoluta id est de inesse) مقالة في المقدمة المطلقة
 [13.9] On the types of conclusions in compound syllogisms / Al-qawl fī jihāt al-natāʾij fī l-maqāyīs al-murakkaba wa-fī maʿnā al-maqūl ʿalā l-kull القول في جهات نتائج في المقاييس المركبة و في معنى المقول على الكل 
 [13.10] Chapter on the dependency of the types of conclusions from the types of premises / Maqāla [...] fī luzūm jihāt al-natāʾij li-jihāt al-muqaddimāt مقالة في لزوم جهات النتائج لجهات المقدمات 
 [13.11] On the mixing of contingent and necessary premises / De mistione contingentis et necessarii
 [13.12] Chapter on the dependency of the conclusions from mixed syllogisms
 [13.13] Chapter on the meaning of "predicated on everything" / Maqāla [...] fī maʿnā al- maqūl ʿalā l-kull wa-ġayr ḏālika مقالة في معنى المقول على الكل و غير ذلك 
 [13.14] Chapter on conditional syllogisms / Maqāla fī l-maqāʾis al-šarṭīya (Aka: Maqāla fī l-qiyās; De conditionali, an per ipsum ostendatur quæsitum primum ignotum) مقالة في القياس 
 [13.15] Exposition of Alfarabi's commentary on the first book of the Prior Analytics / Talḫīṣ šarḥ ʾAbī Naṣr [li-]l-maqāla al-ʾūlā min al-qiyās li-l-ḥakīm... تلخيص شرح ابي نصر للمقالة الاولة من القياس للحكيم

Questions on the Posterior Analytics
 [13.16] On the predicates in demonstrations / Al-qawl fī l-maḥmūlāt al-barāhīn (Aka: Epistola de primitate prædicatorum in demonstrationibus) القول في المحمولات البراهين
 [13.17] On Alfarabi's Book on Demonstration / Min kitāb al-burhān li-ʾAbī Naṣr من كتاب البرهان لابي نصر 
 [13.18] On the definition of individuals / Al-qawl fī ḥadd al-šaḫṣ (Aka: An definitio sit particularis aut universalis tantum) القول في الحد الشخص
 [13.19] On the three types of definition in relation to demonstrations / De triplici genere diffinitionum in ordine ad demonstrationem
 [13.20] On whether the middle term is the cause of the major term / De medio demonstrationis an sit causa maioris extremi
 [13.21] Treatise on the disagreement of Alfarabi and Aristotle on the order of the Posterior Analytics and the rules of demonstrations and definitions / Kitāb fī mā ḫālafa ʾAbū Naṣr li-ʾArisṭū fī kitāb al-burhān min tartībihī wa-qawānīn al-barāhīn wa-l-ḥudūd (Aka: De conditionibus præmissarum demonstrationis) كتاب في ما خالف ابو نصر لارسطو في كتاب البرهان من ترتيبه و قوانين البراهين و الحدود 
 [13.22] On the conditions for the necessity of the premises of demonstrations / De conditionibus quæ requiruntur ad necessitatem præmissarum demonstrationum
 [13.23] On how a demonstration can be transferred from one science to another / Quomodo fiat translatio ab una arte in aliam
 [13.24] On demonstrations quia / De demonstrationibus quia
 [13.25] On the sense in which the definition is better known than the thing defined / Quomodo definitio sit notior ipso definito
 [13.26] On the definitions which are said to differ from demonstrations in their order / De definitionibus quæ dicuntur positione differentes a demonstratione

Philosophy of Nature

Physics
 [14] Short Commentary on the Physics / Jawāmiʿ al-samāʿ al-ṭabīʿī (Part of: Al-jawāmiʿ fī l-falsafa; Jawāmiʿ kutub ʾArisṭūṭālīs fī l-ṭabīʿīyāt wa-l-ʾilāhīyāt) جوامع السماع الطبيعي، جزء من الجوامع في الفلسفة، جوامع كتب ارسطاطاليس في الطبيعيات و الالهيات 
 [15] Middle Commentary on the Physics / Talḫīṣ kitāb al-samāʿ al- al-ṭabīʿī (Aka: [...] li-ʾArisṭūṭālīs; Talḫīṣ al- ṭabīʿī; Wa-laḫaṣa kitāb al-samāʿ al-ṭabīʿī li-ʾArisṭūṭālīs) تلخيص كتاب السماع الطبيعي لارسطاطاليس، تلخيص الطبيعي، 
 [16] Long Commentary on the Physics / Šarḥ [kitāb] al-samāʿ al-ṭabīʿī شرح كتاب السماع الطبيعي

On the Heavens
 [17] Short Commentary on De cælo / Jawāmiʿ al-samāʾ wa-l-ʿālam (Part of: Al-jawāmiʿ fī l-falsafa; Jawāmiʿ kutub ʾArisṭūṭālīs fī l-ṭabīʿīyāt wa-l-ʾilāhīyāt) جوامع السماء و العالم ، جزء من الجوامع في الفلسفة، جوامع كتب ارسطاطاليس في الطبيعيات و الالهيات
 [18] Middle Commentary on De cælo / Talḫīṣ [kitāb] al-samāʾ wa-l-ʿālam تلخيص كتاب السماء و العالم 
 [19] Long Commentary on De cælo / Šarḥ kitāb al-samāʾ wa-l-ʿālam (Aka: Šarḥ kitāb al-samāʾ wa-l-ʿālam li-ʾArisṭūṭālīs; Šarḥ al-samāʾ wa-l-ʿālam) شرح كتاب السماء و العالم 
 [20] De substantia orbis / Ma′amar be-etsem ha-galgal le-Ibn Rushd מאמר בעצם הגלגל לאבן רשד

On Generation and Corruption
 [21] Short Commentary on De generatione et corruptione / Jawāmiʿ kitāb al-kaun wa-l-fasād (Part of: Al-jawāmiʿ fī l-falsafa; Jawāmiʿ kutub ʾArisṭūṭālīs fī l-ṭabīʿīyāt wa-l-ʾilāhīyāt) جوامع كتاب الكون و الفساد
 [22] Middle Commentary on De generatione et corruptione / Talḫīṣ [kitāb] al-kaun wa-l-fasād تلخيص كتاب الكون و الفساد  567/1172

Meteorology
 [23] Short Commentary on the Meteorology / Jawāmiʿ kitāb al-ʾaṯār al-ʿulwīya (Part of: Al-jawāmiʿ fī l-falsafa; Jawāmiʿ kutub ʾArisṭūṭālīs fī l-ṭabīʿīyāt wa-l-ʾilāhīyāt) جوامع كتاب الآثار العلوية 
 [24] Middle Commentary on the Meteorology / Talḫīṣ [kitāb] al-ʾāṯār al-ʿulwīya تلخيص كتاب الآثار العلوية

Biology
 [25] Middle(?) Commentary on De animalibus / Talḫīṣ tisʿ maqālāt min kitāb al-ḥayawān (Aka: Talḫīṣ tisʿ maqālāt min kitāb al-ḥayawān wa-ḏālika min al-ḥādīya ʿašr ʾilā ʾāḫar al-diwān; Talḫīṣ fī l-maqāla al-ḥādīya ʿašara min kitāb al-ḥayawān li-ʾArisṭūṭālīs wa-ḏālika tisʿ maqālāt; Kitāb al-ḥayawān) تلخيص تسع مقالات من كتاب الحيوان، تلخيص تسع مقالات من كتاب الحيوان و ذلك من الحادية عشر الى آخر الديوان، لارسطاطاليس  565/1169 
 [26] Chapter on animals / Maqāla fī l-ḥayawān (Aka: Kalām lahū ʿalā l-ḥayawān) مقالة في الحيوان 
 [27] Short Commentary on De plantis

Questions
 [28] Questions on the Philosophy of Nature / Sefer ha-derušim ha-ṭibʿiyim

Psychology

Commentaries
 [29] "Book on the Soul" or Short Commentary on De anima / Kitāb al-nafs كتاب النفس 
 [30] Middle Commentary on De anima / Talḫīṣ kitāb al-nafs تلخيص كتاب النفس 577/1181
 [31] Long Commentary on De anima / Šarḥ kitāb al-nafs (Aka: Šarḥ kitāb al-nafs li-ʾArisṭūṭālīs) شرح كتاب النفس لارسطاطاليس 
 [32] Commentary on the Parva naturalia / Talḫīṣ al-ḥiss wa-l-maḥsūs. تلخيص الحس و المحسوس Sevilla, 13. Rabīʿ al-ʾāḫar 565 [ca. 01/04/1170]

Treatises on the Intellect
 [33] Enquiry whether the intellect in us, named the material intellect, is able to know in the end the separate forms or not =Epistle on the possibility of conjunction / Kitāb fī l-faḥṣ hal yumkin al-ʿaql ʾallaḏī fīnā wa-huwa al-musammā bi-l-hayūlānī ʾan yaʿqila al-ṣuwar al-mufāriqa bi-ʾāḫirihī ʾau lā yumkin ḏālika wa-huwa al-maṭlūb ʾallaḏī kāna ʾArisṭūṭālīs waʿadanā bi-l-faḥṣ ʿanhū fī kitāb al-nafs (Aka: ʾIggeret ʾefšarut ha-debequt) كتاب في فحص هل يمكن العقل الذي فنى و هو مسمى بالهيولاني ان يعقل الصور المفارقة باخره او لا يمكن ذلك و هو المطلوب الذي كان ارسطاطاليس وعدنا بفحص عنه في كتاب النفس 
 [34] Chapter on the conjunction of the separate intellect with man / Maqāla fī ttiṣāl al-ʿaql al-mufāriq bi-l-ʾinsān (Aka: Masʾala fī ʿilm al-nafs suʾila ʿanhā fa-ʾajāba fīha; Epistola de connexione intellectus abstracti cum homine) مقالة في اتصال العقل المفارق بالانفسان، مسألة في علم النفس سئل عنها في فاجاب فيها 
 [35] Chapter on the conjunction of intellect with man / Maqāla fī ttiṣāl al-ʿaql bi-l-ʾinsān (Aka: Maqāla ʾaiḍan fī ttiṣāl al-ʿaql bi-l-ʾinsān; Maqāla fī ḏālika ʾaiḍan) مقالة في اتصال العقل بالانسان، مقالة ايضا في اتصال العقل بالانسان، مقالة في ذلك ايضا 
 [36] Chapter on the intellect / Maqāla fī l-ʿaql (Aka: Maqāla ʾuḫrā fī ʿilm al-nafs ʾaiḍan) مقالة في العقل، اخرى في علم النفس ايضا 
 [37] Commentary on Alexander's treatise on the intellect / Šarḥ maqālat al-ʾIskandar fī l-ʿaql شرح مقالات الاسكندر 
 [38] Commentary on Avempace's epistle on the conjunction of the intellect with man / Šarḥ risālat ittiṣāl al-ʿaql bi-l-ʾinsān li-bn al-Ṣāʾiġ شرح رسالة اتصال العقل بالانسان لابن الصايغ

ʿAbd Allāh Ibn Rušd (son of Averroes)
 [39] On whether the active intellect unites with the material intellect whilst it is clothed with the body / Hal yattaṣilu bi-l-ʿaql al-hayūlānī al-ʿaql al-faʿʿāl wa-huwa multabis bi-l-jism هل يتصل بالعقل الهيولاني العقل الفعال و هو ملتبس بالجسم

Anonymous
 [40] De animæ beatudine / Tractatus Aueroys de perfectione naturali intellectus secundum mentem philosophi

Metaphysics

Commentaries
 [41] Short Commentary on the Metaphysics / Jawāmiʿ kitāb mā baʿd al-ṭabīʿa (Part of: Jawāmiʿ kutub ʾArisṭūṭālīs fī l-ṭabīʿīyāt wa-l-ʾilāhīyāt; Al-gawāmiʿ fī l-falsafa) جوامع كتاب ما بعد الطبيعة، جوامع كتب ارسطاطاليس في الطبيعيات و الالهيات، الجوامع في الفلسفة
 [42] Middle Commentary on the Metaphysics / Talḫīṣ mā baʿd al-ṭabīʿa (Aka: Talḫīṣ kitāb mā baʿd al-ṭabīʿa li-ʾArisṭūṭālīs; Kitāb talḫīṣ mā baʿd al-ṭabīʿa li-ʾArisṭūṭālīs; تلخيص ما بعد الطبيعة، Averrois in septem libros media expositio ab Hælia Cretensi in latinum conversa, Ante hac nunquam excusa, summis vigiliis elaborata) Cordova, 25. Rabīʿ al-ʾāḫar 570 [11/23/1174].
 [43] Long Commentary on the Metaphysics / Šarḥ mā baʿd al-ṭabīʿa. شرح ما بعد الطبيعة

Practical Philosophy
 [44] Middle Commentary on the Nicomachean Ethics
 [45] Epitome of Plato's Republic

Mathematics
 [46] Epitome of the Almagest

Other
 [47] Fasl Al Maqal fi ma bayn al-Hikma wa al-Shariah min Ittisal فصل المقال فيما بين الحكمة و الشريعة من اتصال 
 [48] Kitab Al Kash an Manahij Al Adilla الكشف عن مناهج الادلة

References

Islamic philosophical texts
Philosophy bibliographies
Works by Averroes
Medieval Islamic world-related lists